"Young Love" is a popular song, written by Ric Cartey and Carole Joyner, and published in 1956. The original version was recorded by Ric Cartey with the Jiva-Tones on November 24, 1956. It was released in 1956 by Stars Records as catalog number 539 and one month later by RCA Records as catalog number 47-6751. Cartey's version never charted.

The song became a hit several times over the years with three near-simultaneous versions released by Sonny James, Tab Hunter, and the Crew-Cuts in 1957, and was later covered with hit versions by Lesley Gore in 1965 and Donny Osmond in 1973. The recordings by James, Hunter and Osmond were all number-one hits: James's on the country and radio airplay charts, Hunter's on the Billboard Hot 100, and Osmond's on the UK Singles Chart.

Sonny James version
The recording by American country singer Sonny James was released by Capitol Records as catalog number 3602. It first reached the Billboard chart on January 5, 1957. On the Disk Jockey chart, it peaked at No. 1; on the Country & Western Best Seller chart, also at No. 1; on the Juke Box chart, at No. 4; on the composite chart of the top 100 songs, it reached No. 2. On Billboard'''s country music charts, it was a No. 1 hit for nine weeks, and remained the longest-reigning of James's 23 chart-topping songs on the chart. Billboard ranked it as the No. 8 song of the year for 1957.

The recording was produced by Ken Nelson and was recorded October 30, 1956, at Bradley Studio in Nashville, Tennessee. The vocal backing was provided by Harlan Powell, one of James's band members at the time, Gordon Stoker and one other individual. The Jordanaires backed Sonny James on several songs in the late 1950s and on a few of his songs when he returned to Capitol in 1963, but it was the vocal sounds of The Southern Gentlemen, who joined him in August 1964, that provided his vocal background thru 1971.

The flip side of James's version of "Young Love" was a song called "You're the Reason I'm in Love." That song was a Top 10 hit on the Billboard country charts in early 1957. In 1971, 14 years after the original, James re-recorded that song in a faster-tempoed, horn-heavy rendition as "That's Why I Love You Like I Do" (the original slower-tempoed song featured an electric guitar solo); the newly recorded, re-titled version was released as a single and reached No. 1 in June 1972.

In the book Helter Skelter by Vincent Bugliosi and Curt Gentry, James' version of this song is mentioned to have been frequently played on the radio at the Spahn Ranch. It was also a term of endearment used by Charles Manson in reference to his female followers.

In 2020, this version was featured in the Netflix psychological thriller film, The Devil All the Time.

Tab Hunter version
The recording by American actor and singer Tab Hunter was released by Dot Records as catalog number 15533. It first reached the Billboard charts on January 19, 1957. It peaked at No. 1 on the following charts:  the Disk Jockey chart, the Best Seller chart, the Juke Box chart, and the composite chart of the top 100 songs. This version stayed No. 1 for a full six weeks and became a gold record. Billboard ranked this version as the No. 4 song for 1957. The success of this record led Warner Bros., where Hunter was a contract player, to form Warner Bros. Records.

The Crew-Cuts version
The recording by the Canadian vocal group The Crew-Cuts was released by Mercury Records as catalog number 71022. It first reached the Billboard chart on January 26, 1957. On the Disk Jockey chart, it peaked at No. 17; on the Juke Box chart, at No. 17; on the composite chart of the top 100 songs, it reached No. 24.

 Lesley Gore version 

American pop star Lesley Gore recorded a version of "Young Love" for Mercury Records in late 1965. Her rendition was released on her sixth studio album. Lesley Gore Sings All About Love, in January 1966. In March of that year, after the album's first two singles failed to make the top 50, Gore's recording was released as the third and final outing from the album as catalog number 72553. The single first entered the Billboard chart on March 26, 1966, and eventually peaked at #50. Gore's version also reached a peak of #24 in Australia, and #43 in Canada. The song was Lesley Gore's biggest commercial success for 1966, and she would not have another chart hit until February 1967 with "California Nights". 

Donny Osmond version

In 1973, the song was revived by American teen idol Donny Osmond on MGM Records. His version featured Donny's spoken recitation on the first half of the second verse. The Mike Curb and Don Costa produced version became a hit on both sides of the Atlantic, reaching No. 23 on the Billboard Hot 100, No. 1 on the UK Singles Chart, spending four weeks at the top in August 1973, and #4 on the Canadian RPM Magazine Top 100.

Chart history

Weekly charts

Year-end charts

Other versions
In 1969 a duet version of the song was made by country music singers Connie Smith and Nat Stuckey. Their version reached No. 20 on the Country Music charts.
In 1976, Ray Stevens charted with the song, reaching No. 48 on Billboard''s country chart and No. 93 on the pop chart.
In 1993, Twister Alley covered the song on their self-titled album, and released it as a single. It peaked at No. 70 on the US Country singles chart.

References

External links
 Lyrics of this song
 

1956 singles
1957 singles
1964 singles
1969 singles
1973 singles
1976 singles
The Crew-Cuts songs
Sonny James songs
Connie Smith songs
Nat Stuckey songs
Donny Osmond songs
Stella Parton songs
Ray Stevens songs
Twister Alley songs
UK Singles Chart number-one singles
Number-one singles in the United States
Number-one singles in Australia
Irish Singles Chart number-one singles
Billboard Top 100 number-one singles
Rockabilly songs
1956 songs
MGM Records singles